The following are the association football events of the year 1878 throughout the world.

Events
 October 14 - First ever floodlit football match takes place at Bramall Lane, Sheffield between teams chosen by the Sheffield Association and local clubs.

Clubs founded in 1878

England
Ashton United F.C.
Burnham F.C.
Everton F.C.
Grimsby Town F.C.
Ipswich Town F.C.
Newton Heath L&YR F.C. (later to become Manchester United)
Matlock Town F.C.
West Bromwich Albion F.C.

Scotland
Airdrieonians F.C. (1878)
Arbroath F.C.

Domestic cups

Births
 15 April – John May (d. 1933), Scotland international forward in five matches (1906–1909).
 16 April – Tip Foster (d. 1914), England international forward in five matches (1900–1902), scoring three goals; the only man to captain England at both football and cricket.
 12 June – Charles Thomson (d. 1936), Scotland international half-back in 21 matches (1904–1914), scoring four goals.
 8 July – Jimmy Quinn (d. 1945), Scotland international forward in eleven matches (1905–1912), scoring seven goals.
 12 November – Tom Jackson (d. 1916), Scotland international player in six matches (1904–1907).
 26 December – Alex Raisbeck (d. 1949), Scotland international full-back in eight matches (1900–1907).
 29 December – Sammy Day (d. 1950), England international forward in three matches (1906), scoring two goals.
 unknown – Sandy MacFarlane (d. 1945), Scotland international forward in five matches (1904–1911).

References

 
Association football by year